The kangaroo dog or kangaroo hound is an Australian type of sighthound purposely crossbred from a variety of sighthound breeds to produce a hunting dog. 

Kangaroo dogs were first bred by colonial settlers in Australia from as early as the 1830s, the aim being to create a sighthound fast, strong and robust enough to outrun, catch and hold a kangaroo without being injured or disembowelled by the animal's powerful, clawed hind legs. From the 1830s onward, colonial hunting clubs were established across Australia's colonies, with native kangaroos, wallabies or dingoes pursued by mounted hunters and their kangaroo dogs. Originally, these dogs were bred from British sighthound breeds, principally the Greyhound and Scottish Deerhound, with occasional Irish Wolfhound blood; later, the Borzoi was also used and more recently the Saluki as well.

Hunting of native species with sighthounds is now banned in Australia; however, kangaroo dogs are still bred for hunting invasive introduced species, such as feral pigs and red foxes.

See also
 Longdog
 Lurcher

References

Dog breeds originating in Australia
Sighthounds
Dog crossbreeds